Mutnuri Krishna Rao was an Indian freedom fighter, editor, scholar and literary critic. He was the editor of Krishna Patrika, a nationalist publication from 1907 to 1945. He is considered to be the doyen of Telugu journalism.

Personal life 
Krishna Rao was born on 1879 in Mutnuru village of Divi taluk, Krishna district of erstwhile Madras Presidency. He lost his parents when he was very young. His father was a district munsif. He was brought up by his paternal uncle. He completed his primary education in Hindu high school , Bandar. He studied F.A course in Noble college, Bandar. Raghupathi Venkataratnam Naidu was one of his teachers. Rao was influenced by his ideology and used to attend the meetings of Brahmo Samaj.

Later he went to Madras to study B.A in Christian College. He got acquainted with Pattabhi Sitaramaiah. As he focused more on literature, he returned to Bandar in 1903 without completing his degree. Inspired by Vande Mataram movement, he toured Bengal along with Bipin Chandra Pal.

Family 
He lived with his wife. The couple had two daughters and a son. The eldest daughter and only son passed away before him, and his second daughter became a widow.

Career
He joined Krishna Patrika as an assistant editor. He got promoted as an editor in 1907 and worked there till his death in 1945. He criticized the policies of British government in his editorials regarding the amount spent on welfare of the poor and developing educational institutions. He also ran a Magazine called Andhra Bharati for some time.

Memorial 
He died on 25 June 1945 because of Ascites. The town hall in Machilipatnam is named after him.

References

External links 
 Editorials of Mutnuri Krishna Rao on archive.org

1879 births
1945 deaths
Indian independence activists from Andhra Pradesh